Gero Kretschmer and Alexander Satschko were the defending champions, but did not compete this year.

Luke Saville and Jordan Thompson won the title after defeating Saketh Myneni and Jeevan Nedunchezhiyan 3–6, 6–4, [12–10] in the final.

Seeds

Draw

References

External links
 Main draw

Gemdale ATP Challenger - Doubles
Pingshan Open